Sycosis vulgaris  is a cutaneous condition characterized by a chronic infection of the chin or bearded region. The irritation is caused by a deep infection of hair follicles, often by species of Staphylococcus or Propionibacterium bacteria. Asymptomatic or painful and tender erythematous papules and pustules may form around coarse hair in the beard (sycosis barbae) or the back of the neck  (sycosis nuchae).

See also 
 Folliculitis
 List of cutaneous conditions

References 

Bacterium-related cutaneous conditions